William Jacob Propst (March 10, 1895 – February 24, 1967) was a pinch hitter in Major League Baseball. He played for the Washington Senators.

References

External links

1895 births
1967 deaths
Washington Senators (1901–1960) players
People from Lamar County, Alabama
Baseball players from Alabama
Minor league baseball managers